Iberomesornithidae is an extinct family of enantiornithine birds.

Order Iberomesornithiformes
Family Iberomesornithidae
Enantiornithes gen. et sp. indet. CAGS-IG-07-CM-001
Iberomesornis (Early Cretaceous)
Noguerornis (Early Cretaceous)

External links
 Translated version of biolib.cz page

Enantiornitheans
Prehistoric dinosaur families